The men's team sprint was one of the 10 men's events at the 2007 UCI Track World Championship, held in Palma de Mallorca, Spain.

Fourteen teams of 3 cyclists each participated in the contest. After the qualifying, the fastest 2 teams raced for gold, and 3rd and 4th teams raced for bronze.

The qualifying and the finals were held on the evening session on 29 March.

Qualifying

Finals

References

Men's team sprint
UCI Track Cycling World Championships – Men's team sprint